Kamdi is a small village comprising around 10 households around 19 kilometers east of Pokhara, Nepal.

Populated places in Kaski District